Everman can refer to:
 Jason Everman, musician
 Seth Everman, YouTuber and musician
 Everman, Kentucky
 Everman, Texas
 Everman (band)
 Berem, The Everman, a character in the Dragonlance series.